The Free Catalan Territory are those declared municipalities or regions of Catalonia that had approved a motion in a plenary session by the councillors of the town or the region council, as they represent the municipality's local authority. Such motions declare that Spanish laws and regulations are considered provisional, waiting for the Government and Parliament of Catalonia to enact new Catalan laws after having assumed national sovereignty, and therefore turning Catalonia into an independent state.

Free Catalan Territory (in Catalan, Territori Català Lliure) was the expression chosen by the councillors of Sant Pere de Torelló in order to define the status quo of the municipality on September 3, 2012, and was also the first town in Catalonia to give itself this name. From its new condition, the council of Sant Pere de Torelló announced that the October 12, holiday becomes an ordinary weekday, directly conflicting the Spanish legislation.

Since then, more municipalities joined this initiative and approved similar declarations to Sant Pere de Torelló's. Also, there are some municipalities that preferred approving independentist motions, but without explicitly declaring themselves Free Catalan Territory, like Caldes de Montbui or Tàrrega.

The October 11th 2012 the first comarcal declaration was approved. The Comarcal Council of La Garrotxa approved a collective motion to declare all that region "Free and Sovereign Catalan Territory". Also, the same day, the Comarcal Council of the Alt Penedès approved supporting those municipalities that approve that kind of motion, hanging an Estelada flag at the balcony of the offices of the Comarcal Council as a symbol "of Catalonia's people desires of sovereignty".

After the first month since Sant Pere de Torelló's declaration, a Catalan newspaper stated that there are approximately 660,000 "free Catalan citizens", which represent almost 9% of Catalonia's total population.

Municipalities declared Free Catalan Territory 
Since September 3, 2012, 197 Catalan municipalities and five Comarcal councils have declared themselves Free Catalan Territory, representing approximately 20.2% of whole Catalonia's lands.

See also 
 Catalan independence
 Assemblea Nacional Catalana
 Association of Municipalities for Independence
 Catalan independence referendums, 2009–2011
 2012 Catalan independence demonstration

References

External links 
 Analysis of the situation, Miguel-Anxo Murado for Russia Today news channel, as can be seen on YouTube
 Fabrega and several other town mayors in the Catalan region have declared independence from Spain, calling themselves the "Free Catalan Territory" for Reuters, as can be seen in Yahoo.

Catalonia
Catalan independence movement
Separatism in Spain